Route 7 is a state highway with its northern terminus at U.S. Route 24 in northeast Independence and its southern terminus at Interstate 44 southeast of Richland (near the town of Laquey which it doesn't quite reach).  The section between Harrisonville (at a junction with Interstate 49/U.S. Route 71) and Clinton (at a junction with Route 13) provides an important link for traffic between Springfield and Kansas City.

Route description
The route begins at Interstate 44, exit 150, as a two-lane highway.  It then heads northwest into Richland, intersecting with Route 133.  From there, it continues northwest to a concurrency with Route 5, starting three miles south of Camdenton.  In Camdenton, it crosses U.S. 54, and continues northwest, crossing the Lake of the Ozarks.  After crossing the lake, Route 5 enters Greenville, and the highway diverges north, and Route 7 heads west, pass through Climax Springs and Edwards then continues west to another concurrency with US 65.  The combined route crosses Harry S. Truman Reservoir and the Osage River and then enters Warsaw, where the concurrency ends; Route 7 heads west and crosses more arms of the Truman Reservoir.  At Clinton, it intersects Route 13 and Route 52, and then becomes a four-lane highway, running northwest to Interstate 49/US 71 in Harrisonville.  After a brief concurrency with I-49/U.S. 71, Route 7 heads north as a two-lane highway, crossing Route 58 in Pleasant Hill, Route 150, and US 50.  In Blue Springs, it crosses US 40 and I-70.  Continuing north, Route 7 is the eastern terminus of Route 78, before itself terminating at US 24 in Independence.

History
Missouri Route 7 links the Kansas City area to the Ozarks, however it was not always called Route 7. Starting in 1926-27 it connected US 71 to US 50 only, by 1937 it had been extended to US 40. The section that runs east from US 71 - US 65 (1935), to US 54, and later on to US 66 (1953) was once called State Route 35.  This was changed to Route 7 in 1959. In the early 1970s with the creation of Truman Lake, the Osage River Bridge was bypassed with a new mile long span.

Business route

A one mile business route of MO 7 exists in Pleasant Hill.

Major intersections

References

External links

007
Transportation in Pulaski County, Missouri
Transportation in Camden County, Missouri
Transportation in Benton County, Missouri
Transportation in Henry County, Missouri
Transportation in Cass County, Missouri
Transportation in Jackson County, Missouri